As the World Turns is a studio album by Jamaican reggae band Black Uhuru. It was released on September 7, 2018 through Black Uhuru Official. It was nominated for Grammy Award for Best Reggae Album at 61st Annual Grammy Awards.

Track listing

Personnel

Black Uhuru – main artist, producers
Derrick "Duckie" Simpson – vocals, producer, executive producer
Horace "King Hopeton" Campbell – keyboards, drum programming, producer, engineering, mastering
Leebert "Gibby" Morrison – guitar
Cliff Manswell – bass
Roland "Phanso" Wilson – drums
Jay William – drum machine, mixing
Everald Ray – horn
Wayne Holliness – keyboards (track 14)
Anthony "Tony Asher" Brissett – keyboards (track 15)
Frederick "Fat Strings" Thomas – guitar (tracks: 8, 14, 15)
Donovon "Vision" Rodrigues – bass (tracks: 8, 14, 15), producer
Danny "Axeman" Thompson – bass (track 13)
Joslyn "Speckles" McKenzie – drums (tracks: 14, 15)
Jeffrey Campbell – vocals (track 3)
Roy "Bugle" Thompson – vocals (track 7)
Fitz Albert Cotterell – vocals (track 15)
Nikki Burt – background vocals
Carlene "Kay Starr" Ford – background vocals (track 14)
Jermaine "Jah-Son" Forde – producer, mixing
Maurice "Seani B" Delauney – producer
Don Chandler – producer
Robert "Taj" Walton – mixing
Mike Gener – executive producer, design
Stephanie Long – design
Carmelita Harris – photography
Sampsa Sipila – photography
Benji Cooper – photography
Jan Salzman – photography

References

External links

2018 albums
Black Uhuru albums